Ara Malikian (born 1968) is a Lebanese-born violinist of Armenian descent. He was educated in Germany and now based in Spain.

Biography
Born in Beirut, Lebanon in September 14th, 1968 to an Armenian family, Malikian started playing the violin at a young age, encouraged by his violinist father, who has performed with well known Lebanese singer Fairuz. Malikian gave his first concert at the age of 12, and when he was 14, he was invited to study in Hochschule für Musik und Theater Hannover located in Hannover, Germany. At age 15, he was the youngest student to be admitted in this school. Later he continued his studies in the Guildhall School of Music & Drama in London, at the same time receiving lessons from professors, Ruggiero Ricci, Ivry Gitlis, Herman Krebbers and members of the Alban Berg Quartet.

He has assimilated the music of other cultures like those of the Middle East (Arab and Jewish), Central Europe (gipsy and Klezmer), Argentina (tango) and Spain (flamenco).

With a wide-ranging repertoire, which includes the majority of all the important pieces written for the violin (concertos with orchestra, sonatas and pieces with piano and chamber music), he has also premiered pieces from modern composers like Franco Danatoni, Malcolm Lipkin, Luciano Chailly, Ladislav Kupkovic, Loris Tjeknavorian, Lawrence Roman and Yervand Yernakian. Malikian also performa solo violin recitals, with programs featuring complete cycles of the "24 Caprices" of Paganini, the "Six Sonatas" of Eugène Ysaÿe and the "Sonatas and Partitas" of J.S. Bach.

He has been recognized in numerous competitions, among which are the First Prizes obtained in the International Competitions "Felix Mendelssohn" (1987, Berlin, Germany) and "Pablo Sarasate" (1995, Pamplona, Spain) besides other prizes like those from the competitions "Niccolo Paganini" (Genoa, Italy), "Zino Francescatti" (Marseille, France), "Rodolfo Lipizer" (Gorizia, Italy), "Jeunesses Musicales" (Belgrade, Yugoslavia), "Rameau" (Le Mans, Francia), "International Artists Guild" (New York, USA), and the "International Music Competition of Japan". In 1993, he received the "Prize for Artistic Devotion and Achievement" from the German Ministry of Culture.

He has played in more than 40 countries: USA New York (Carnegie Hall); Paris, France (Salle Pleyel); Viene, Italy (Musikverein); Toronto, Canada (Ford Center); Madrid, Spain (Auditorio Nacional and Teatro Real); Venice, Italy; Los Angeles, USA; Taipei, Taiwan; Hong Kong, China; Kuala Lumpur, Malaysia; Cuba; Barcelona and Bilbao, Spain; among others. He has also participated in the festivals at Aspen, Colorado USA; Colmar and Prades, France;  Schleswig-Holstein and Braunschweig, Germany; San Sebastián and Segovia, Spain; Bergen, Norway; Freden and Mettlach, Germany; Prague, Czech Republic, Colombia and Brazil.

As a soloist, he has been invited by the following orchestras: Tokyo Symphony Orchestra, Bamberg Symphony Orchestra, Zürich Chamber Orchestra, London Chamber Orchestra, Geneva Chamber Orchestra, Orquesta Sinfónica de Madrid, Sinfónica de Portugal (pt), Chamber Orchestra of Tübingen, Moscu Virtuosi, Belgrade Philharmonic, Toulouse Chamber Orchestra, Armenia Philharmonic and Community of Madrid Orchestra, under the direction of conductors such as Mariss Jansons, Peter Maag, Jesús López-Cobos, Vladimir Spivakov, Miguel Ángel Gómez-Martínez, Luis Antonio García Navarro, Vassili Sinaisky, Edmond de Stoutz, Gudni Emilson, Juan José Mena and JoAnn Falletta.

He lives in Madrid, where he was the concertmaster of the Orquesta Sinfónica de Madrid (resident orchestra of the Madrid Royal Opera). In Le Boeuf sur le Toit by D. Milhaud, in the version for violin and orchestra, under the direction of Gómez Martínez; and in the "Concerto for Violín and Orchestra in D minor" by Aram Khachaturian under the baton of Jesús López-Cobos.

Since 1995, Malikian has played in a duo with the pianist Serouj Kradjian, also of Armenian origin, recorded the complete cycle of Sonatas by Robert Schumann (Hänsler) with him, as well as the record "Miniatures" (Malkrafon), an anthology of music for violin and piano written by Armenian composers. He has also recorded numerous discs for record companies such as BMG, Auvidis, Trittico Classics and Elite Music, including, among many other compositions, "The Four Seasons" of Vivaldi (more than 80,000 copies sold for UNICEF).

Malikian maintains a close collaboration with José Luis Montón. As well as working with the Lebanese singer Fairuz, the flamenco dancers Joaquín Cortés and Belén Maya, the Ensamble Nuevo Tango and the jazz pianist Horacio Icasto. He has also collaborated with film-music composers like Alberto Iglesias, with whom he recorded the soundtrack for Hable Con Ella, a movie by Almodóvar, or Pascal Gainge in Otro Barrio by the director Salvador García Ruiz.

Ara Malikian has released albums "Manantial" and "De la felicidad" accompanied by the flamenco guitarist José Luis Montón.  This last CD was nominated by the Spanish Academy of Music for the best New Music CD of the year.  With Warner Bros., Malikian recorded a double CD, which contained some of the most significant works of Paganini, including his "24 Caprices for Violin Solo", an album with some compositions by Sarasate accompanied by the Armenian pianist Serouj Kradjian, the "Six Sonatas" for violin by Ysaÿe and the "Sonatas and Partitas" by J. S. Bach.

Ara Malikian was nominated twice for the best classical performance in the 2007 Music Prizes in Spain, by the Spanish Academy for his recording of the Poema Concertante by Xavier Montsalvatge, along with the Castilla y León Symphonic Orchestra; as well as for a piece with Joan Valent, Suso Sáiz and Marc Blanes.

He participated as a guest artist in the film J: Beyond Flamenco, by Carlos Saura (2016).

Discography

Albums
1995: Le quattro stagioni 
1996: 750 Jahre Wölpinghausen 
1996: Miniatures 
1997: Bow on the String 
1999: 500 motivaciones
2000: All Seasons for Different 
2000: Robert Schumann 
2002/2004: Manantial 
2003: 24 Caprices for Solo Violin by Paganini
2003: Sarasate 
2003: Six Sonatas for Solo Violin by Ysaÿe
2003: Sonatas and Partitas for Solo Violin by Bach
2004: El arte del violín 
2004: The Four Seasons by Vivaldi 
2005: De la felicidad 
2005: De los Cobos / Montsalvatge 
2006: Tears of Beauty 
2007: Meeting with a friend
2007: Lejos 
2010: Conciertos románticos españoles de violín (Orquesta sinfónica de Castilla & León-Alejandro Posada & Ara Malikian) 
2011: Con los ojos cerrados (Ara Malikian & Fernando Egozcue Quinteto) 
2011: Christmas mood
2013: Pizzicato
2015: 15
2016: The Incredible Story of Violin
2017: Symphonic at Las Ventas (Live)
2019: Royal garage

As guest artist
2006: Insula poética En Son Brull 
2008: La ley innata Extremoduro
2011: Material defectuoso Extremoduro 
2011: Krasivuye glazha Huecco
2013: Para todos los públicos Extremoduro
2019: Ira Dei Mägo de Oz

Soundtracks
1999: Manolito Gafotas  – Directed by Miguel Albaladejo
2000: El otro barrio – Directed by Salvador García Ruiz
2001: Los pasos perdidos – Directed by Manane Rodríguez
2002: Hable con ella⁣ – Directed by Pedro Almodóvar
2005: La mala educación – Directed by Pedro Almodóvar
2006: Ecos – Directed by Estefanía Muñiz 
2010: Pájaros de papel – Directed by Emilio Aragón
2016: J: Beyond Flamenco – Directed by Carlos Saura
2016: The Promise – Directed by Terry George

References

External links
 IEMEVE artist management: more information and sound sample
 Personal website
 Video Ara Malikian in J: Beyond Flamenco

1968 births
Living people
Armenian violinists
Lebanese musicians
Lebanese people of Armenian descent
Paganini Competition prize-winners
Alumni of the Guildhall School of Music and Drama
21st-century violinists
Musicians from Beirut